Antichrista (French: Antéchrista) is a Belgian novel by Amélie Nothomb. It was first published by "Éditions Albin Michel" in 2003 in France. It was translated into English in 2005.

Plot
The novel is about two female students, called Blanche and Christa.

Blanche (French: white, here: "ingénue"), a shy, inconspicuous and retiring girl, gets to know Christa at the University of Brussels and they become friends. Christa is the first real friend in Blanche's life and that is why in the beginning she is very excited and nervous about their friendship. It turns out that Christa is the exact counterpart of Blanche: she is talented, brilliant and above all extremely popular. But it does not take Blanche long to figure out that Christa plays false and loose with her and slowly becomes her "headsman", the Antichrist. Therefore, Blanche has to overcome her trepidation and anxiety to get away from the "Antichrista" and save her family from an "apocalypse".

Chronology

In terms of the dynamics of the time structure, there are increasingly dramatic leaps in time; at the beginning, the action is told from day to day, whereas later in weekly steps (from Monday to Monday) and finally towards the end of the novel in monthly time intervals.

Blanche and Christa

The two main characters of the story are named Blanche and Christa. Blanche is a shy and reclusive 16-year-old girl. She is ashamed of her difficulties in approaching other persons (especially such of her own age). Christa represents the opposite of Blanche. She is also 16 years old and comes from Malmedy in the East of Belgium. Christa speaks German, laughs frequently and is very outgoing.

Christian symbols in the novel

None of the characters in this novel has a connection to or affinity for the Christian religion. Neither Blanche nor her parents nor Christa are practicing Christians. Nonetheless, they use Christian metaphors, parables and symbols, e.g. the Parable of the Prodigal Son, the Epiphany, Antichrist, Apocalypse, Kiss of Judas, and Crucifixion. The references and parallels to Christian confession have lost their religious meaning in this novel and are associated with a negative connotation: Christa recklessly exploits the Parable of the Prodigal Son to distinguish herself. The Epiphany is debased to a farce. Christa is labeled "Antichrista" by Blanche because of her vicious intrigues. Christa's satanic manipulations within the microcosm of the Hast family reaches an apocalyptic scale. The Kiss of Judas aids uncovering Christa's maliciousness. The Crucifixion serves as an illustration for Blanche's inner disunity.

References 

2003 Belgian novels
French-language novels
Novels by Amélie Nothomb
Éditions Albin Michel books